W Sagittarii (W Sgr, Gamma-1 Sagittarii (γ¹ Sgr)) is a multiple star system star in the constellation Sagittarius, and a Cepheid variable star.

W Sagittarii is an optical line-of-sight companion nearly a degree from the much brighter γ2 Sgr (Al Nasl) which marks the nozzle or spout of the teapot asterism.

System
W Sgr is listed as component A of a multiple star system catalogued as ADS 11029 and WDS J18050-2935.  Components B and C are at 33" and 46" respectively and both are 13th magnitude.  They are purely optical companions, not physically associated with W Sgr.

Component A, W Sgr, is itself a triple star system, with the components referred to as W Sgr Aa1, Aa2, and Ab. These have also been referred to as components Aa, Ab, and B respectively. The outer companion Ab has been resolved at a separation of 0.14" and is over 5 magnitudes fainter than the primary supergiant. The inner components can only be identified spectroscopically by their radial velocity variations.

Variability

The supergiant component W Sgr Aa1 is a variable star which pulsates regularly between magnitudes 4.3 and 5.1 every 7.59 days.  During the pulsations, that temperature and spectral type also vary.  It is classified as a Classical Cepheid (δ Cephei) variable.

References

Sagittarius (constellation)
Sagittarii, Gamma1
Sagittarii, W
Classical Cepheid variables
F-type supergiants
G-type supergiants
5
4
Spectroscopic binaries
6742
164975
088567
F-type main-sequence stars
A-type main-sequence stars
Durchmusterung objects